Urozana metaphaenica is a moth in the subfamily Arctiinae. It was described by Paul Dognin in 1916. It is found in Brazil.

References

Moths described in 1916
Lithosiini